Charles Darwin National Park is a national park in the Northern Territory of Australia, 4 km southeast of Darwin. It is notable for its World War II–era concrete bunkers, one of which has been converted into a visitors centre and display of World War II memorabilia. It also has lookouts towards the city of Darwin. It contains middens used by the Larrakia people.

The park has extensive fire trails suitable for bush walking, as well as a mountain bike trail maintained by the Darwin Off-Road Cyclists Club.  Regular events held in the park include the Earthdance festival.

See also
 Protected areas of the Northern Territory

References

Tourist attractions in Darwin, Northern Territory
National parks of the Northern Territory
Protected areas established in 1998
1998 establishments in Australia